Big Brother & the Holding Company is the debut album of Big Brother and the Holding Company, with Janis Joplin, their main singer. Recorded during three days in December 1966 for Mainstream Records, it was released in the summer of 1967, shortly after the band's major success at the Monterey Pop Festival. Columbia took over the band's contract and re-released the album, adding two extra tracks, and putting Joplin's name on the cover. Several tracks on the album were released as singles, the most successful being "Down on Me" on its second release, in 1968.

Recording
The band signed to Bob Shad's local record label Mainstream Records while stranded in Chicago after a promoter ran out of money when their concerts did not attract the expected attendance. Initial recordings took place in Chicago in September 1966, but these were not satisfactory, and the band returned to San Francisco. The band recorded the tracks "Blindman" and "All Is Loneliness" in Los Angeles, and these were released by Mainstream as a single, which did not sell well. After playing at a "happening" at Stanford in early December 1966, the band traveled to Los Angeles to record 10 tracks between 12 and 14 December 1966, produced by Bob Shad.

Release and reception

The album was released by Mainstream Records in August 1967, shortly after the band's major success at the Monterey Pop Festival. Two tracks, "Coo Coo" and "The Last Time", were released separately as a single, while the tracks from the previous single, "Blindman" and "All Is Loneliness", were added to the remaining eight tracks. When Columbia took over the band's contract and re-released the album, they included "Coo Coo" and "The Last Time", and put "featuring Janis Joplin" on the cover. The album has been reissued in various formats several times since 1967.

The album was a minor success, peaking at number 60 and almost producing a Top 40 hit with the song "Down on Me". In a retrospective review for Allmusic, Joe Viglione feels the production by Bob Shad is weak, though the material and the performances are respectable.

Track listing

Personnel
Big Brother and the Holding Company
 Janis Joplin – vocals
 Peter Albin – bass guitar
 Sam Andrew – guitar, vocals
 David Getz – drums
James Gurley – guitar, vocals

References

External links
 

1967 debut albums
Big Brother and the Holding Company albums
Albums produced by Bob Shad
Mainstream Records albums